POxy 2990 (or P. Oxy. XLI 2990) is one of four examples of libelli found at Oxyrhynchus in Egypt.

Text
Original lines are retained (and numbered).
Text in [brackets] is reconstructed to fill a gap (lacuna) in the papyrus.
Text in (parentheses) is full spelling of an abbreviation.
Letters with subscript dots are incomplete or indistinct.

See also
Lapsi (Christian)
Oxyrhynchus papyri
Other libelli: POxy 658, POxy 1464, POxy 3929
Warrant to arrest a Christian: POxy 3035

References

External links
'P.Oxy. XLI 2990' at Oxyrhynchus Papyri Project, Oxford University.
Image: P. Oxy. XLII 2990 (© Copyright the Egypt Exploration Society).

POxy 2990
2990
POxy 2990